Benedikt Krug (born 7 February 1995) is a German footballer who plays as a centre-back for Schwaben Augsburg.

Career
Krug joined 2. Bundesliga side Erzgebirge Aue at the start of 2015, though the team was relegated to the 3. Liga at the end of the season. He made his professional debut for the club in the 2015–16 DFB-Pokal on 8 August 2015, coming on as a substitute in the 89th minute for Simon Skarlatidis in the home match against 2. Bundesliga side Greuther Fürth, with the match finishing as a 1–0 win. In 2016, he was on trial with Chicago Fire of Major League Soccer, though he did not sign with the club.

References

External links
 
 Benedikt Krug at kicker.de
 
 
 BC Aichach statistics at BFV.de

1995 births
Living people
German footballers
Association football central defenders
BC Aichach players
FC Erzgebirge Aue players
FV Illertissen players
Regionalliga players
TSV Schwaben Augsburg players
TSV Rain am Lech players